List of Guggenheim Fellowships awarded in 1930. 85 fellowships were distributed. The Latin-American Exchange Fellowships were introduced this year and brought two fellows to the United States to study.

1930 U.S. and Canadian Fellows

1930 Latin-American Exchange Fellows

See also
 Guggenheim Fellowship
 List of Guggenheim Fellowships awarded in 1929
 List of Guggenheim Fellowships awarded in 1931

References

1930
1930 awards